The Convention of Lhasa,
officially the Convention Between Great Britain and Thibet, was a treaty signed in 1904 between Tibet and Great Britain, in Lhasa, the capital of Tibet. It was signed following the British expedition to Tibet of 1903–1904, a military expedition led by Colonel Francis Younghusband, and was followed by the Anglo-Chinese Convention of 1906.

Terms
The main points of the treaty allowed the British to trade in Yatung, Gyantse, and Gartok while Tibet was to pay a large indemnity of 7,500,000 rupees, later reduced by two-thirds, with the Chumbi Valley ceded to Britain until payment was received. Further provisions recognised the Sikkim-Tibet border and prevented Tibet from entering into relations with other foreign powers. As a result, British economic influence grew 
further in Tibet. The treaty to be between two sovereign countries and excluded China but the British government later continued to recognize that Tibet remained under the sovereignty of the Qing dynasty of China.
Article IX specified that the government of Tibet would guarantee that, without the previous consent of the British government, it would allow:
1. "No portion of Tibetan territory shall be ceded, sold, leased, mortgaged or otherwise given for occupation, to any foreign Power; 
2. "No such Power shall be permitted to intervene in Tibetan affairs;
3. "No Representatives or Agents of any foreign Power shall be admitted to Tibet;
4. "No concessions for railways, roads, telegraphs, mining or other rights, shall be granted to any foreign Power, or the subject of any foreign Power. In the event of consent to such concessions being granted, similar or equivalent concessions shall be granted to the British Government;
5. "No Tibetan revenues, whether in kind or in cash, shall be pledged or assigned to any foreign Power, or to the subject of any foreign Power."

The size of the indemnity had been the hardest factor to accept for the Tibetan negotiators. The Secretary of State for British India, St John Brodrick, had in fact expressed the need for it to be "within the power of the Tibetans to pay" and gave Younghusband a free hand to be "guided by circumstances in this matter". Younghusband raised the indemnity demanded from 5,900,000 to 7,500,000 rupees, and further demanded the right for a British trade agent, based at Gyantse, to visit Lhasa "for consultations". It seems that he was still following Lord Curzon's geo-political agenda to extend British influence in Tibet by securing the Chumbi Valley for Britain and denying it to the Russians as part of The Great Game.  Younghusband wanted the payment to be met by yearly instalments; it would have taken about 75 years for the Tibetans to clear their debt, and since British occupation of the Chumbi valley was surety until payment was completed, the valley would remain in British hands. Younghusband wrote to his wife immediately after the signing; "I have got Chumbi for 75 years. I have got Russia out for ever". The regent commented that "When one has known the scorpion [meaning China] the frog [meaning Britain] is divine".

Aftermath
The Qing imperial resident in Lhasa, the Amban, later publicly repudiated the treaty, while Britain announced that it still accepted Chinese claims of authority over Tibet. Acting Viceroy Lord Ampthill reduced the indemnity by two-thirds and considerably eased the terms in other ways. The provisions of this 1904 treaty were revised in the Anglo-Chinese Convention of 1906. The British, for a fee from the Qing court, also agreed "not to annex Tibetan territory or to interfere in the administration of Tibet", while China engaged "not to permit any other foreign state to interfere with the territory or internal administration of Tibet".

See also
British expedition to Tibet (1903–1904)
Convention Between Great Britain and China Respecting Tibet (1906)
Simla Convention (1913–1914)

References

Bibliography

External links
Convention Between Great Britain and Thibet (1904)

Treaties concluded in 1904
Treaties of Tibet
Treaties of the United Kingdom (1801–1922)
20th century in Tibet
Tibet–United Kingdom relations